Released in 2010 by Deep Shag Records, On the Road with Ellison Volume 4 is a collection of humorous and thought provoking moments from the vaults of Harlan Ellison. The CD features a new essay written by Harlan for this release. When Harlan Ellison speaks, no topic is off-limits. This is not Harlan reading his work; it's a collection of interesting observations and stories from his life.

Track listing
A Cautionary Prologue: Slippery, Also Gross, When Wet
And How Was Your Year? A Wandering Baedeker
How I Came To Be A Pistolero For The Weirdest Guy In The World
Babylon Jive, Or, In Straczynski We Trust
The Fanged Businessman
Quickies: Moments Minus Any Context
Mad About Jew
One For The Masters: Not a “Rant” - Just Passion Unleashed
I Ain’t Rude, I’ve Just Got A Low Bullshit Threshold
Philistinism Makes Lucid Copy For Dolts

References
 Fingerprints on the Sky: The Authorized Harlan Ellison Bibliography, Richmond, T. (2017). Edgeworks Abbey/Subterranean Press.

External links
Deep Shag Records listing for the album
All Music Guide review

2010 live albums
Harlan Ellison albums
Deep Shag Records albums
2010s spoken word albums
Spoken word albums by American artists
Live spoken word albums